Brittany Perry (born 9 March 1994) is a former Australian rules footballer who played for Port Adelaide in the AFL Women's competition (AFLW). She previously played for the Greater Western Sydney Giants and the Gold Coast Suns.

She was selected at pick 43 in the 2018 draft and made her debut in round 2 of the 2019 season. Perry played four matches in her debut season before being delisted by the Giants.

In June 2022, Perry was traded to Port Adelaide.
In March 2023, Perry was delisted with fellow teammate Tessa Doumanis.

References

External links 

1994 births
Australian rules footballers from South Australia
Living people
Port Adelaide Football Club (AFLW) players
Greater Western Sydney Giants (AFLW) players
Gold Coast Football Club (AFLW) players